Naanum Rowdy Dhaan is a 2015 Indian Tamil-language romantic action comedy film written and directed by Vignesh Shivan, produced by actor Dhanush under his banner Wunderbar Films, and distributed by Lyca Productions. The film stars Vijay Sethupathi and Nayanthara, with Parthiepan, Raadhika Sarathkumar, RJ Balaji, and Anandaraj in supporting roles. The soundtrack album and background score was composed by Anirudh Ravichander. The cinematography was handled by George C. Williams, and editing was done by A. Sreekar Prasad.

The film follows Pondy Paandi (Vijay Sethupathi), the son of a police inspector, who becomes involved in illegal activities. He falls in love with Kadhambari (Nayanthara), a deaf woman on a quest to get revenge against ruthless gangster Killivalavan (Parthiban).

Vignesh Shivan announced the project in April 2013, with composer Anirudh being initially cast as the protagonist. However, Anirudh opted out of the project and Gautham Karthik and Lavanya Tripathi were cast, with Gautham Vasudev Menon financing the project. In a turn of events, the project failed to materialise and in August 2014, Dhanush came on board to produce the film, while Sethupathi and Nayanthara were confirmed as the lead cast members.

Principal photography commenced in December 2014 and ended in June 2015. The film was shot in Puducherry and Chennai over 75 days. It was released worldwide on 21 October 2015.

Plot
Pandiyan, aka Pondy Pandi, is the son of Puducherry police inspector P. Meena Kumari. Despite being an inspector's son, he grows up being friendly with criminals and upon reaching adulthood, unbeknownst to his mother, he becomes a thug, though an incompetent one. Pandi and his friends come across a deaf woman, Kadhambari, and Pandi immediately falls in love with her. Kadhambari is the daughter of an honest police officer, Ravikumar.

Fifteen years before, then-sub-inspector Ravikumar was in pursuit of Killivallavan, aka Killi, a dreaded gangster. Killi had been arrested in public by Ravi, and in retaliation, he slapped Ravi when the officer was shopping with Kathambari. Later, Ravi arrested almost all of Killi's gang members. Feeling angered, Killi sent Ravi a bomb as a gift. The bomb killed Ravi's wife and caused his daughter Kadhambari to lose her hearing.

Afterward, Ravi and his daughter moved to another part of the country and didn't return until his last year of service. Kadhambari seeks Pandi's help to find her father, who has not spoken to her for the past two days. Pandi soon learns that Ravikumar was killed by Killi the same night he met Kadhambari, but hides the fact from her so as not to upset her. A week later, Kadhambari learns about her father's death and is determined to avenge him by going after Killi.

Pandi agrees to help her, with the promise that he will restrain Killi while she stabs him. Pandi and his gang, along with Kadhambari, hatch a plan to murder Killi while he is travelling. However, this is foiled as their plan gets mixed up with that of Mansoor, Killi's political rival, who wants to contest an upcoming election in place of Killi's mistress, Baby. Pandi's gang is enraged and despite Pandi's reassurances, they decide not to help Kadhambari further.

She then determines to go ahead on her own, as she does not want Pandi and his friends to split up over her. She reaches Killi's hideout, but on attempting to kill him, he knocks her out. Pandi soon arrives at the hideout and he and Kadhambari try to kill the gangster, but they are unsuccessful. At this juncture, Mansoor arrives at the hideout; he and Killi stab each other to death. Pandi falsely takes credit for their deaths in order to impress Kadhambari. Ultimately, Pandi, disillusioned with the thug lifestyle, becomes a police officer, as per his mother's wishes.

Cast and characters

 Vijay Sethupathi as Pondicherry "Pandi" Pandiyan
 Suriya Vijay Sethupathi as Younger V. Pandi
 Nayanthara as Kadhambari "Kadhu"
 Baby Anikha as Younger Kadhu
 Parthiban as Killivalavan
 Raadhika Sarathkumar as Inspector Meena Kumari, Pandi's mother
 RJ Balaji as Doshi Baba, Pandi's sidekick
 Rajendran as Don Raja, Pandi's role model
 Anandaraj as Pondicherry Don
 Mansoor Ali Khan as Politician Mansoor, Killi's enemy
 Azhagam Perumal as Inspector Ravikumar, Kadhu's father
 Meenakshi as Baby, Killi's mistress
 R. Sundarrajan as Killi's advisor
 R. N. R. Manohar as Thalaivar
 Aathma Patrick as Pondicherry Don's sidekick
 Udayabanu as Rahul Thatha
 Louna Simon as Kamatchi
 Sathish Krishnan in a special appearance
 Anirudh Ravichander in a special appearance in the title song

Production

Development
In April 2013, Vignesh Shivan, who had directed Podaa Podi (2012), announced that he was set to make a film featuring composer Anirudh Ravichander in the leading role. The project, titled Naanum Rowdy Dhaan, was described as an "urban flick", and the team tried to rope in Samantha Akkineni for the female lead role. The film was titled after a dialogue spoken by Vadivelu in Thalai Nagaram (2006). In a turn of events in the following month, Anirudh chose not to make an acting debut and the film was briefly shelved as the team looked for a replacement lead actor.

The project was subsequently officially announced by Gautham Vasudev Menon in November 2013, who revealed that he would produce the film and that they had signed Gautham Karthik to feature in the leading role, while Anirudh would retain his position as composer. George C. Williams was signed as the cinematographer after being acclaimed for his work in Raja Rani, while Dhilip Subbarayan was announced as the film's action director. Vignesh Shivan revealed that the film would be based on a 19-year-old youngster caught in the midst of a gangster setting and noted he hoped to shoot the film in Mumbai, Chennai, and Puducherry. Lavanya Tripathi was signed to play the female lead role of a deaf girl and noted that she was impressed by Vignesh Shivan's narration of the script. However, the project failed to take off, and Shivan continued to discuss it with different actors including Ashok Selvan, as he looked for a producer. In a turn of events, Dhanush announced via Twitter that he would be producing the film under his Wunderbar Films banner and also posted details about the cast and crew and the title design on 29 August 2014, coinciding with Vinayagar Chathurthi. While the principal crew was retained, the lead roles went to Vijay Sethupathi and Nayanthara.

Filming
The team began to shoot on 3 December 2014, with the first leg of the venture held in Puducherry for a span of forty days. Scenes were shot at the Thirukameeswarar Temple in Villianur. On 6 December 2014, RJ Balaji joined the cast during the first schedule. Actor Vijay Sethupathi stated that he had put on weight for some of his recent roles, so he worked hard for two months to shed those pounds. He worked out and went on an extensive diet regime as well —even forgoing food at times.

On 2 January 2015, Anandaraj joined as an addition to the film's cast and shot for the film in Puducherry. The first schedule of the film was completed in the first week of January 2015 and soon after, the team began filming the second schedule. It was reported that Nayanthara would play a hearing-impaired girl in the production. On 10 February 2015, actor Parthiepan was reported to have been cast in the film. As per sources, Rajkiran was rumoured to play the cop role and Nayanthara's father, but the part went to Azhagam Perumal instead. As of mid-May 2015, major portions of the film had been completed. The final schedule of the film was kickstarted in Puducherry on 19 May 2015. Principal photography was completed on 25 June 2015, after sixty-five days. On 10 October 2015, Nayanthara dubbed herself for her character in the first time in Tamil.

A scene from the movie, where Nayanthara is seen buying beer from a liquor store, went viral on social media before the film's release. The Hindu Makkal Katchi (HMK) political party opposed the scene and demanded that it be deleted, otherwise during its launch they would protest the film and Nayanthara. In Chennai, HMK put up signs showing portraits of Nayanthara draped with a beer-bottle garland. After Nayanthara released a statement saying it was just a scene in a movie, her effigy was publicly burned by Hindu Munnani in February 2015.

Soundtrack

The soundtrack album and background score for Naanum Rowdy Dhaan were composed by Anirudh Ravichander, in his first collaboration with Vignesh Shivan, who previously worked with Dharan Kumar on his debut film, Podaa Podi (2012). Vignesh chose Anirudh to compose the film's music owing to their friendship. The soundtrack features six tracks, five of which were penned by Shivan himself, and the sixth one was written by Thamarai. Four of the songs featured Anirudh's voice. Other singers on the album include Neeti Mohan, Benny Dayal, Sid Sriram, and Sean Roldan. In August 2015, Anirudh tweeted that the songs were expected to be released soon. The composer planned to release the songs as individual singles<ref>{{Cite news|last=|first=|date=19 September 2015|title='Naanum Rowdy Dhaans single strategy|language=en-IN|work=The Hindu|url=https://www.thehindu.com/features/metroplus/naanum-rowdy-dhaans-single-strategy/article7715829.ece|access-date=7 August 2020|issn=0971-751X}}</ref> instead of opting for a promotional audio launch. The first single was "Thangamey". The full soundtrack album was launched on 23 September 2015.

The album received positive reviews from critics as well as listeners. Writing for The Times of India, Sharanya CR gave it four out of five stars and wrote, "Anirudh is totally upping his game through this album, which sounds fresh, unlike his last few albums". A critic from BollywoodLife.com also gave the album four out of five stars and noted that it was "one of the best soundtracks of the year", while praising the composer for his versatility balancing between melodious songs and "fun feel good numbers". Behindwoods rated the album 3.25 out of 5 and called it "a musical treat from Anirudh". Karthik Srinivasan of Milliblog reviewed it with the words "After a series of so-so soundtracks, Anirudh comes back with a bang in Naanum Rowdy Dhaan!" Vipin Nair of Music Aloud gave the album 8.5 out of 10 and called it "One of Anirudh Ravichander's best soundtracks to date!" Moviecrow gave the release 3.75 out of 5 and stated that "the songs are engaging without any shades of Anirudh's previous compositions".

Release
Lyca Productions announced that they had bought the distribution rights for Naanum Rowdy Dhaan, along with Wunderbar Films' other project, Visaranai, directed by Vetrimaaran. The filmmakers announced that the film would be released on 2 October 2015, coinciding with Gandhi Jayanti. However, to avoid clashing with the release of Puli, they instead decided to postpone the release until 21 October 2015, which coincided with Dusshera. The film received a U/A certificate from the Central Board of Film Certification. It opened across 475 screens in Tamil Nadu, while facing competition from 10 Endrathukulla.

Marketing
The filmmakers unveiled the first-look poster for the film on 12 August 2015, featuring Vijay Sethupathi looking fierce. The official teaser was unveiled on 27 September 2015, and the trailer was launched on 7 October 2015. Satellite rights for the film were sold to Sun TV. The film was published to audiences outside India by Herotalkies on 15 November 2015, through their online movie streaming portal.

ReceptionNaanum Rowdy Dhaan received mostly positive reviews. Writing for The Times of India, M. Suganth gave it four out of five stars and wrote, "The plot might come across as a serious revenge drama, but Vignesh Shivan displays a lightness of touch throughout that makes the film so much fun. And, he keeps things breezy even when situations get serious". Sify wrote, "Vignesh Sivan's Naanum Rowdy Dhaan (NRD) is a feel-good laugh riot, a perfect movie to hang out with friends. You are guaranteed loads of fun and sure to come out with a big smile on your face". Behindwoods rated the film three out of five and noted, "Naanum Rowdy Dhaan is sure to entertain you and your family this festival season. This is a film that you can just relax, sit back and enjoy with a tub of butter popcorn!" S. Saraswathi of Rediff.com gave it 3.5 out of 5 and stated, "Simple, sweet and uncomplicated, Naanum Rowdy Dhaan is a refreshing romantic comedy that deserves a watch". Sudhir Srinivasan of The Hindu reviewed it with the words "Almost all the jokes, both subtle and loud, work. And they're everywhere, and often admirably, without heed to political correctness". The Guardian gave it 3 out of 5 stars and wrote, "Despite some rough edges and missed opportunities, Vignesh Shivan delivers a well-written, likably played film where every element feels integrated and thought through". Indiaglitz'' gave the film three out of five stars and stated, "Naanum Rowdy Dhaan' is a fulfilling commercial entertainer that will be liked by all in the family". Kaushik LM reviewed it with "Naanum Rowdy Dhaan, it is a winning recipe of fabulous music, well-cast lead actors and comedy which works for the most part. But the feeling of tedium and restlessness, at experiencing the same pattern, is unmistakable".

Legacy
Nayanthara's dialogue, "Ongala Podanum Sir", spoken within the film, inspired a movie of the same name.

References

External links
 
 

2015 films
Indian black comedy films
2010s Tamil-language films
Indian gangster films
Indian films about revenge
Films scored by Anirudh Ravichander
Indian comedy thriller films
Films shot in Puducherry